Lobanovo is a rural locality (a village) in Lavrovskoye Rural Settlement, Sudogodsky District, Vladimir Oblast, Russia. The population was 27 as of 2010.

Geography 
Lobanovo is located 11 km northwest of Sudogda (the district's administrative centre) by road. Ovtsyno is the nearest rural locality.

References 

Rural localities in Sudogodsky District